St Mary's Cathedral, Port Elizabeth is a religious building that is affiliated with the Anglican Church of South Africa and is located at St Mary's Terrace,  Central in the city of Port Elizabeth in Eastern Cape province, South Africa.

It serves as the main church and seat of the Diocese of Port Elizabeth which was created in 1970. The current incumbent is The Ven. Fumanekile Witness Kula.

References

External links

Anglican cathedrals in South Africa
Buildings and structures in Port Elizabeth